Oothkalooga Creek is a stream in the U.S. state of Georgia. It is a tributary to the Oostanaula River.

Oothkalooga is a name derived from the Cherokee language, meaning "beaver".

See also
List of rivers of Georgia (U.S. state)

References

Rivers of Bartow County, Georgia
Rivers of Gordon County, Georgia
Rivers of Georgia (U.S. state)